Maria Magdalena van Beethoven, née Keverich (19 December 1746 – 17 July 1787) was the wife of the Bonn court musician Johann van Beethoven, and the mother of the composer Ludwig van Beethoven. Her birthplace is now a museum, the Mutter-Beethoven-Haus.

Life 

Maria Magdalena Keverich was born in Ehrenbreitstein, a village on the Rhine opposite Koblenz (and now part of Koblenz). Her parents were Johann Heinrich Keverich (1701–1759) and Anna Klara (Clara) née Westorff (1707–1768), who were married in 1731.

Maria Magdalena was the youngest of their six children. On 30 January 1763, she married Johann Georg Leym, who was in the service of the Archbishop of Trier; he died in 1765.

She married Johann van Beethoven at the Church of St Remigius, Bonn on 12 November 1767. Johann's father was Kapellmeister at the court of the Electorate of Cologne, which was in Bonn, and Johann was a court musician there. Johann and Maria van Beethoven had seven children: the future composer Ludwig was the second, born in 1770.

Maria died in Bonn in 1787 of tuberculosis, aged 40. Her birth place is now a museum, named .

References

External links 
 
 Mutter-Beethoven-Haus

1746 births
1787 deaths
People from Koblenz
Beethoven family
Tuberculosis deaths in Germany